Direct Factory Outlet (DFO) is a brand of factory outlet shopping centres in Australia. They are large-floor warehouse buildings containing partitioned stores where retail outlets sell excess or previous seasons' stocks at reduced prices. Vicinity Centres have full or partial ownership of seven of the eight stores.

History
Direct Factory Outlet was founded in 1997 by Liberty Oil founders David Goldberger and David Wieland. The first centre was opened at Moorabbin Airport in 1994. Other shareholders were property developer Geoff Porz and former Australian Competition & Consumer Commission chief Graeme Samuel through a blind trust. Valued at A$1.5 billion, in early 2010 the business was put up for sale with a number of retail investment funds expressing interest.

DFO centres have traditionally been located around airports: a side effect of the Airports Act of 1996, the Federal Government has planning control over the land, meaning state planning legislation can be bypassed by developers. In addition the property developer is able to exploit the cost difference between retail and industrial rents, gives outlet centre operators a distinct advantage over traditional shopping centres. A survey by The Age in 2007 found that in all three DFO-owned centres, most shops carried at least some full-price, current-season stock, available at normal shopping centres. By 2008 five legal challenges to DFO developments have been made by competing retail developers and the Shopping Centre Council of Australia, all being unsuccessful.

On 16 August 2010, lead bank Suncorp-Metway, along with St George Bank, National Australia Bank and Lloyds Banking Group, issued a notice to parent company Austexx demanding repayment within 24 hours of the A$450 million they are owed. The South Wharf centre was under an A$500 million debt, with work on completing the centre stopped after workers placed bans over non-payment. Parent company Austexx was understood to have had total debts of A$1.2 billion, with the four relatively successful DFO sites used as cross-collateral for bank-funded expansion into five other less successful locations including Canberra, Cairns and Hobart. The group of banks appointed insolvency specialists KordaMentha as advisers, with the entire group facing receivership. Negotiations continued until a deal was struck on 19 August, the four banks extending their funding to allow the South Wharf development to be completed. The ten DFO shopping complexes were then be sold off separately to repay the $1 billion owed to the banks. In September 2010, CFS Retail acquired the Essendon, Homesbush and Moorabbin centres and a 50% shareholding in South Bank. All four passed to Vicinity Centres when it merged with CFS Retail. Vicinity would acquire the Brisbane centre in May 2016.

Locations

, there were eight centres located in four states. Vicinity Centres have a 50% shareholding in two of centres, and 100% in another five.

Brisbane
It was acquired by Vicinity Centres in May 2016.

Essendon
It opened in October 2005. On 21 February 2017, an aeroplane crashed into the centre. A Beechcraft Super King Air on a passenger charter flight bound for King Island, Tasmania crashed shortly after takeoff from nearby Essendon Airport with all five people aboard killed. As the crash occurred before the centre opened for the day, only staff were present, all of whom were accounted for.

Homebush
It opened in 2002.

Jindalee
DFO Jindalee is located in the Brisbane suburb of Jindalee. It was constructed in 2007, and was sold by Austexx Group to Chin Yin in 2016 to be managed by Geon Property. It is one of two DFO centres that Vicinity Centres has no ownership in, the other being Carins. It underwent a major refurbishment from 2019 through 2021.

Moorabbin
Originally Fairways Leisure Market, the centre opened in 1994 on land adjacent to Moorabbin Airport. In 1997 the centre was purchased by the Austexx Group as the group's first DFO shopping centre.

Perth
The shopping centre opened on 3 October 2018 with 113 retail outlets and 1,500 parking bays. Vicinity has a 50% shareholding with the remainder owned by Perth Airport Development Group Investments. It opened in 2018.

South Wharf
It opened in 2009. In April 2019, Vicinity Centres became the sole shareholder after buying out the Plenary Group.

Uni Hill
It opened in 2008. Vicinity has a 50% shareholding with the remainder owned by MAB Corporation

Essendon Centre plane crash

Just before 9am on 21 February 2017, a Beechcraft Super King Air on a passenger charter flight bound for King Island, Tasmania crashed shortly after takeoff from nearby Essendon Airport. All five people aboard the flight were killed. As the shopping centre had not opened yet, only staff were at the centre, all of whom were accounted for. The incident was the worst aviation accident in Victoria for 30 years.

See also
The District Docklands

References

External links

Outlet malls in Australia
Retail companies established in 1997
Retail companies of Australia
1997 establishments in Australia